{{Automatic_taxobox
| image =Ardozyga mesochra.jpg
| image_caption = Ardozyga mesochra
| taxon = Ardozyga
| authority = Lower, 1902
| synonyms = 
Protolechia Meyrick, 1903
Prodosiarcha Meyrick, 1904
Protolechia Meyrick, 1904
Lexiarcha Meyrick, 1916
Phyzanica Turner, 1917
Semocharista Meyrick, 1922
Baryzancla Turner, 1932
Baryzancla Turner, 1933
Brachyzancla Turner, 1947
}}Ardozyga' is a genus of moths in the family Gelechiidae.

Species
 Ardozyga aclera (Meyrick, 1904)
 Ardozyga acrocrossa (Turner, 1947)
 Ardozyga acroleuca (Meyrick, 1904)
 Ardozyga actinota (Meyrick, 1904)
 Ardozyga aeolopis (Meyrick, 1904)
 Ardozyga amblopis (Meyrick, 1904)
 Ardozyga amphiplaca (Meyrick, 1932)
 Ardozyga ananeura (Meyrick, 1904)
 Ardozyga annularia (Turner, 1919)
 Ardozyga anthracina (Meyrick, 1904)
 Ardozyga arenaria (Turner, 1933)
 Ardozyga arganthes (Meyrick, 1904)
 Ardozyga argocentra (Meyrick, 1904)
 Ardozyga aspetodes (Meyrick, 1904)
 Ardozyga autopis (Meyrick, 1904)
 Ardozyga aversella (Walker, 1864)
 Ardozyga banausodes (Meyrick, 1904)
 Ardozyga bistrigata (Meyrick, 1921)
 Ardozyga caminopis (Meyrick, 1904)
 Ardozyga catadamanta (Diakonoff, 1954)
 Ardozyga catarrhacta (Meyrick, 1904)
 Ardozyga celidophora (Turner, 1919)
 Ardozyga cephalota (Meyrick, 1904)
 Ardozyga ceramica (Meyrick, 1904)
 Ardozyga chalazodes (Turner, 1919)
 Ardozyga chenias (Meyrick, 1904)
 Ardozyga chionoprora (Turner, 1927)
 Ardozyga chiradia (Meyrick, 1904)
 Ardozyga cladara (Meyrick, 1904)
 Ardozyga compsochroa (Meyrick, 1904)
 Ardozyga cosmotis (Meyrick, 1904)
 Ardozyga creperrima (Turner, 1919)
 Ardozyga crotalodes (Meyrick, 1904)
 Ardozyga crypsibatis (Meyrick, 1904)
 Ardozyga crypsicneca (Turner, 1927)
 Ardozyga cryptosperma (Meyrick, 1921)
 Ardozyga decaspila (Lower, 1899)
 Ardozyga deltodes (Lower, 1896)
 Ardozyga desmatra (Lower, 1897)
 Ardozyga diplanetis (Meyrick, 1904)
 Ardozyga dysclyta (Turner, 1933)
 Ardozyga dysphanes (Turner, 1947)
 Ardozyga diplonesa (Meyrick, 1904)
 Ardozyga elassopis (Turner, 1919)
 Ardozyga elpistis (Meyrick, 1904)
 Ardozyga emmeles (Turner, 1933)
 Ardozyga enchotypa (Turner, 1919)
 Ardozyga englypta (Meyrick, 1904)
 Ardozyga eumela (Lower, 1897)
 Ardozyga euprepta (Turner, 1933)
 Ardozyga euryarga (Turner, 1919)
 Ardozyga eustephana (Turner, 1919)
 Ardozyga exarista (Meyrick, 1904)
 Ardozyga flexilis (Meyrick, 1904)
 Ardozyga frugalis (Meyrick, 1904)
 Ardozyga furcifera (Turner, 1919)
 Ardozyga galactopa (Meyrick, 1916)
 Ardozyga glagera (Turner, 1919)
 Ardozyga gorgonias (Meyrick, 1904)
 Ardozyga gypsocrana (Turner, 1919)
 Ardozyga haemaspila (Lower, 1894)
 Ardozyga hedana (Turner, 1919)
 Ardozyga hilara (Turner, 1919)
 Ardozyga hormodes (Meyrick, 1904)
 Ardozyga hylias (Meyrick, 1904)
 Ardozyga hypocneca (Turner, 1919)
 Ardozyga hypoleuca (Meyrick, 1904)
 Ardozyga idiospila (Meyrick, 1922)
 Ardozyga invalida (Meyrick, 1904)
 Ardozyga involuta (Turner, 1919)
 Ardozyga iochlaena (Meyrick, 1904)
 Ardozyga irobela (Turner, 1947)
 Ardozyga ithygramma (Turner, 1933)
 Ardozyga liota (Meyrick, 1904)
 Ardozyga lithina (Lower, 1899)
 Ardozyga loemias (Meyrick, 1904)
 Ardozyga loxodesma (Meyrick, 1904)
 Ardozyga mechanistis (Meyrick, 1904)
 Ardozyga megalommata (Meyrick, 1904)
 Ardozyga megalosticta (Turner, 1919)
 Ardozyga melicrata (Turner, 1919)
 Ardozyga mesochra (Lower, 1894)
 Ardozyga mesopsamma (Turner, 1919)
 Ardozyga microdora (Meyrick, 1904)
 Ardozyga micropa (Meyrick, 1904)
 Ardozyga molyntis (Meyrick, 1904)
 Ardozyga nephelota (Meyrick, 1904)
 Ardozyga neurosticha (Turner, 1933)
 Ardozyga nothrodes (Meyrick, 1921)
 Ardozyga nyctias (Meyrick, 1904)
 Ardozyga obeliscota (Meyrick, 1904)
 Ardozyga obscura (Turner, 1933)
 Ardozyga ochrobathra (Turner, 1933)
 Ardozyga odorifera (Meyrick, 1904)
 Ardozyga orthanotos (Lower, 1900)
 Ardozyga pacifica (Meyrick, 1904)
 Ardozyga pelogenes (Meyrick, 1906)
 Ardozyga pelogramma (Meyrick, 1904)
 Ardozyga penthicodes (Meyrick, 1921)
 Ardozyga phasianis (Meyrick, 1904)
 Ardozyga phloeodes (Meyrick, 1904)
 Ardozyga plinthactis (Meyrick, 1904)
 Ardozyga poenicea (Turner, 1947)
 Ardozyga polioxysta (Turner, 1933)
 Ardozyga prisca (Meyrick, 1904)
 Ardozyga proscripta (Meyrick, 1921)
 Ardozyga psephias (Meyrick, 1904)
 Ardozyga pyrrhica (Turner, 1919)
 Ardozyga sarisias (Meyrick, 1904)
 Ardozyga sciodes (Meyrick, 1904)
 Ardozyga scytina (Meyrick, 1904)
 Ardozyga secta (Meyrick, 1921)
 Ardozyga semiographa (Turner, 1919)
 Ardozyga sisyraea (Meyrick, 1904)
 Ardozyga sodalisella (Walker, 1864)
 Ardozyga sporodeta (Turner, 1919)
 Ardozyga stratifera (Meyrick, 1904)
 Ardozyga subnexella (Walker, 1864)
 Ardozyga tabulata (Meyrick, 1904)
 Ardozyga taracta (Turner, 1919)
 Ardozyga telopis (Meyrick, 1904)
 Ardozyga temenitis (Meyrick, 1904)
 Ardozyga tetralychna Lower, 1902
 Ardozyga tetraploa (Meyrick, 1904)
 Ardozyga thanatodes (Lower, 1893)
 Ardozyga thermoplaca Lower, 1902
 Ardozyga thyridota (Meyrick, 1904)
 Ardozyga thyrsoptera (Meyrick, 1904)
 Ardozyga trachyphanes (Meyrick, 1904)
 Ardozyga trichalina (Meyrick, 1904)
 Ardozyga trichosema (Meyrick, 1904)
 Ardozyga trichroma (Turner, 1933)
 Ardozyga tridecta (Lower, 1900)
 Ardozyga trochias (Meyrick, 1921)
 Ardozyga tyroessa (Turner, 1933)
 Ardozyga vacatella (Walker, 1864)
 Ardozyga voluta (Meyrick, 1904)
 Ardozyga xanthocephala (Meyrick, 1904)
 Ardozyga xestolitha (Meyrick, 1904)
 Ardozyga xuthias (Meyrick, 1904)

Excluded species
 Brachyzancla sporima'' Turner, 1947

References

 
Gelechiinae
Moth genera